Ettela'at Haftegy ("Weekly  Information") is an Iranian nationwide tabloid weekly magazine that is published on paper which was launched on 21 March 1941 in Tehran. It is also published electronically. The chief editor of this magazine is Fathollah Javadi, and its founder was Abbas Massoudi who had previously founded the daily newspaper Ettela'at in 1926.

References

1941 establishments in Iran
Magazines established in 1941
Magazines published in Tehran
News magazines published in Asia
Persian-language magazines
Weekly magazines published in Iran